Burrumbuttock is a town in the central southern part of the Riverina region of the Australian state of New South Wales.

Its name comes from the parish name and "T.P Gibson's estate".<ref>[http://www.nswrail.net/library/station_names.php Irish, C.A. (1927) Names of Railway Stations in New South Wales, With their Meaning and Origin]</ref>

History

The town sits in an area that was termed Burrumbuttock station in 1839. The Crown Lands Alienation Act (Robertson Land Act) of 1861 saw the arrival of settlers to the region. By the 1870s, a large number of South Australian settlers of German origin came to Burrumbuttock. Burrumbuttock Post Office opened on 1 May 1883. A school, called Burrumbuttock East, was opened in 1889; the name was changed to Burrumbuttock Public School in 1929. The origin of the name "Burrumbuttock" is unclear, but believed to be of indigenous (probably Wiradjuri) in origin because the word "Burrum" usually refers to water. Locals claim that the name means "bullock's backbone", but there is no evidence for this name.

Today

The town is known by its inhabitants as Burrum'', with attractions ranging from a visit to the Wirraminna Environmental Education Centre, pulling a beer at the Farmers Inn Hotel, and a trip to the historic Burrum Hall.

The community holds its sporting culture in high regard. The town has tennis and cricket clubs, and an Australian Rules football and netball club. The football and netball club merged with the neighboring town Brocklesby in 2006 to create a single club with a broader population base.

Notable People
Tony Armstrong, former Australian Rules Footballer and television presenter; 2022 Logie Awards winner for best new talent.

Notes and references

External links
 Burrumbuttock Railway Siding
 Brock Burrum FNL website

 

Towns in the Riverina
Towns in New South Wales